Tobias Fleckstein (born 24 April 1999) is a German professional footballer who plays as a centre-back for MSV Duisburg.

Career
In the summer of 2020, Fleckstein moved to MSV Duisburg. He made his professional debut for MSV Duisburg in the first round of the 2020–21 DFB-Pokal on 14 September 2020, in the home match against Bundesliga side Borussia Dortmund. He made his 3. Liga debut in a 1–1 draw against FSV Zwickau on 26 September 2020. He signed a new three-year contract on 16 May 2022, keeping him with the club until 2025.

Career statistics

References

External links

Tobias Fleckstein at kicker.de

1999 births
Living people
People from Herne, North Rhine-Westphalia
Sportspeople from Arnsberg (region)
Footballers from North Rhine-Westphalia
German footballers
Association football central defenders
Holstein Kiel II players
MSV Duisburg players
3. Liga players
Regionalliga players